The Montreal Grand Prix was an annual auto race held in Montreal from 1984 to 2006

Montreal Grand Prix may also refer to:

Figure skating
 The competitions of the ISU Junior Grand Prix in Canada that were held in Montreal:
 1999 Junior Grand Prix in Canada
 2002 Junior Grand Prix in Canada
 2005 Junior Grand Prix in Canada

Racing
 Molson Indy Montreal, 1980s USAC-CART-PPG-IndyCar race at SanAir
 Canadian Grand Prix, 1978-onwards Formula One race at Circuit Gilles Villeneuve
 Montreal ePrix, 2010s Formula E race on the streets of Downtown Montreal
 Grand Prix Cycliste de Montréal, 2010s UCI bicycle race on the streets of Montreal

See also
 Mont-Tremblant Grand Prix (disambiguation)